Jacqueline Parent is a French actress. In 1980 she starred in Le Voyage en douce directed by Michel Deville.

Selected filmography 
The Big Night (1976)
The Police War (1979)
Le Voyage en douce (1980)
Malevil (1981)

References

External links

French film actresses
Living people
20th-century French actresses
Year of birth missing (living people)